Thallium(I) oxide is the inorganic compound of thallium and oxygen with the formula Tl2O in which thallium is in its +1 oxidation state. It is black and produces a basic yellow solution of thallium(I) hydroxide (TlOH) when dissolved in water.  It is formed by heating solid TlOH or Tl2CO3 in the absence of air.  Thallium oxide is used to make special high refractive index glass.  Thallium oxide is a component of several high temperature superconductors. Thallium(I) oxide reacts with acids to make thallium(I) salts.

Tl2O adopts the anti-cadmium iodide structure in the solid state.  In this way, the Tl(I) centers are pyramidal and the oxide centers are octahedral.

Thallium(I) oxide, like all thallium compounds, is highly toxic.

Preparation 
Thallium(I) oxide can be produced by decomposition of thallium(I) hydroxide at 100 °C or by heating thallium(III) oxide in the absence of air to 700 °C.

References

External links
 U.S. Geological Survey – Thallium
 Extract from The Columbia Encyclopedia

Thallium(I) compounds
Oxides